Bratton may refer to:

Places 
Bratton, Saskatchewan, Canada
Bratton, Shropshire, England
Bratton, Somerset, England
Bratton, Wiltshire, England

Other 
Bratton (surname)

See also
Bratton Fleming, Devon
Bratton Seymour, Somerset
Brattön island, Kungälv, Sweden